Walter Homolka (born 21 May 1964 in Landau an der Isar) is a German rabbi.

Homolka studied in Munich, London, Lampeter and Leipzig and has a PhD from King's College London. He is an adjunct full professor at the University of Potsdam and rector at its Abraham Geiger College, which was founded in 1999. On 14 September 2006, Homolka ordained the first three rabbis in Germany since the Holocaust at the New Synagogue of Dresden. Rabbi Homolka is chairman of the Leo Baeck Foundation and an executive board member of the World Union for Progressive Judaism.

In 2007, Homolka established the Jewish Institute of Cantorial Arts, of which he is the president. A member of the French Legion of Honour, he is widely published internationally and holds a variety of distinctions. The Hebrew Union College - Jewish Institute of Religion conferred upon him a "Doctor Humanarum Litterarum" honoris causa.

Homolka is active in Jewish-Christian dialogue as a guest at the Central Committee of German Catholics. In 2008, he condemned the new Good Friday Prayer instituted by Pope Benedict XVI.

Conversion
Homolka is a convert to Judaism. He explained that his conversion took place because he was fascinated by the concept of a hidden God in Judaism, and also because he opposed and wanted to leave the "Catholic spiritual monopoly" of his family and social environment.

Criticism
In May 2022, several newspapers in Germany featured a series of in-depth reports on sexual misconduct by Homolka and his husband, including inappropriate behaviour that was targeted at students of the Abraham Geiger College he founded and where he served as rector. As a result, Homolka was forced to announce he was temporarily stepping down from all his roles.

The results of an investigation by an independent commission of the University of Potsdam published in October 2022 confirmed the accusation of abuse of power at the Abraham Geiger Kolleg by Homolka, but no sexual harassment. Specifically, Homolka was found to have "exploited institutional power and dependency relationships". In the process, decisions had been made "which had a very negative impact on the further life and career of the persons concerned and for which Mr. Homolka was personally attributed responsibility due to the abundance of his direct and indirect possibilities of influence." The investigative commission made recommendations for the unbundling of Homolka's management functions, the establishment of independent control bodies and a review of rules of procedure. Homolka was approved for a semester off for the 2022/23 winter semester. There were no criminal, civil or civil service consequences for Homolka. He remains a civil servant and is on leave of absence.

Since 2022, allegations of plagiarism against him have been investigated. On June 14, 2022, King's College removed the writing from its online library.

Honours and awards
 Grand Decoration of Honour in Silver for Services to the Republic of Austria (2006)
 Muhammad-Nafi-Cheleby Award (2011)
 Knight of the Legion of Honour (France)
 Austrian Cross of Honour for Science and Art (2001)
 Gold Decoration of the Province of Salzburg
 Gold Decoration for Services to the Province of Lower Austria
 Silver Medal of the City of Vienna
 Knight of the Order of Merit of the Italian Republic
 International Honorary Citizen of New Orleans
 Bundeswehr Cross of Honour in Gold
 Officer of the German Federal Merit Order
 Order of Merit of Berlin
 Order of Merit of Brandenburg

References

External links 
 http://www.whomolka.de/

1964 births
Living people
20th-century British rabbis
21st-century British rabbis
20th-century German rabbis
21st-century German rabbis
Alumni of King's College London
Chevaliers of the Légion d'honneur
Converts to Reform Judaism
German Reform rabbis
Knights of the Order of Merit of the Italian Republic
LGBT Jews
Members of the European Academy of Sciences and Arts
Officers Crosses of the Order of Merit of the Federal Republic of Germany
People from Dingolfing-Landau
Recipients of the Austrian Cross of Honour for Science and Art
Recipients of the Badge of Honour of the Bundeswehr
Recipients of the Grand Decoration for Services to the Republic of Austria
Recipients of the Order of Merit of Berlin
Studienstiftung alumni
Academic staff of the University of Potsdam